Callodus is a monotypic genus of weevils belonging to the family Brachyceridae. The only species is Callodus costipennis.

References

Brachyceridae
Monotypic weevil genera